Saleh Fouzan (born February, 1956) is a cinematographer. He has produced 34 feature films through his company Shamel Media Production & Distribution.

Fouzan was born in Riyadh, Saudi Arabia in February 1956.

Biography
Fouzan was born in Riyadh, Saudi Arabia in February 1956. As an immigrant working in Egypt from 1986 until 1997, he had produced 34 feature films through his company Shamel Media Production & Distribution.

Education and experience
Dramatic Construction Workshops, Brussels, Belgium,			1996-1997, Script writing workshops
Personal research,								    	                2000-2003, Cinema Direction
Professional experience in cinema production and distribution, 		        30 years
Visiting lecturer in the Lebanese German University	,			        2007-2009, Institute for the Performing Arts

Productions
DEKE AL-BARABER		       DIRECTOR Hessian Kamal 		EGYPT
ATABAT ALSITAT	       	  	DIRECTOR Ali Abdulkhalig		 EGYPT
RAGHABAT				       DIRECTOR Kareem Thia Alden	EGYPT
ALHUB WALRAUB		       DIRECTOR Kareem Thia Alden	EGYPT
WATAMAT AQUALLUH		DIRECTOR Majdy Muharram	 EGYPT
RAJEL MUHIM JEDA		       DIRECTOR Aussam Alshmaa	EGYPT
MASSRAA ALTHIAB		       DIRECTOR Ahmad Saqer     	EGYPT
REJAL BILLATHAMAN		       DIRECTOR Abdullhadi Taha	EGYPT
KALABSHAT			       DIRECTOR Ahmad Saqer		EGYPT
FIKH ALTHAALIP			       DIRECTOR Mohamed Marzooq	EGYPT
TAEAQ ALSHARR		       DIRECTOR Mohamed Marzooq	EGYPT
MUHIMA FIMUNTASIF ALLIAL     DIRECTOR Maha Arram		EGYPT
MUZIAA BARIDE			       DIRECTOR Maha Arram		EGYPT
HARAM LILEAJAR		       DIRECTOR Maha Arram		EGYPT
JIDAAN AL-HILMIAH 		       DIRECTOR Najdy Hafith		EGYPT
LU KUNT MAKANI		       DIRECTOR Shariff Hamoudah	EGYPT
LIAL WARIJAL			       DIRECTOR Shariff Hamoudah	EGYPT
AHLA MENALSARAF MAFISH      DIRECTOR Samir Hafith		EGYPT
BALTEAH BENT BAHRRY	       DIRECTOR Salah Sirry	        	EGYPT
ZAMAN AL-AQUIA		       DIRECTOR Ahmaed Throat	        EGYPT
THAT ALRABAA			       DIRECTOR Shariff Hamoudah	EGYPT
KHAMIS YGHZO AL-QAHIRAH   DIRECTOR Said Saif			EGYPT
KHIANAH				       DIRECTOR Shariff Hamoudah	EGYPT
GHARAMEAT SAIAS		       DIRECTOR Samir Hafith		EGYPT

Co-productions
WILLAD AL-AIHE			DIRECTOR Sheriff Yahia		EGYPT
YA NAS YA HOUH			DIRECTOR Atiff Salem		EGYPT
ALMUAALIMAH SAMAH		DIRECTOR Mohamed Abdulaziz	EGYPT
LILATE ASSAAL			        DIRECTOR Mohamed Abdulaziz	EGYPT
AL-AQRAAB 				DIRECTOR Adel Auadh		EGYPT
ALSAQUDE				        DIRECTOR Adel Alaasser		EGYPT
IHNA ILLY SARAQNA 
ALHARRAMIA				       DIRECTOR Midhat Alsubaay	EGYPT
AUDAT AL- HARRIB		       DIRECTOR Yussif Abu Saif		EGYPT
AL-KATHAB WASAHIBAH	       DIRECTOR Ahmad Tharout		EGYPT
ALAAB BELNAAR			       DIRECTOR Nasser Hussein		EGYPT
QAUAIL ALRUMMAN
(LES SIESTES GRENADINES)	       DIRECTOR Mahmood Ben Mahmood	TUNISIA

Scripts
The Years of Mercy,									SAUDI ARABIA
Rutrut (Muddy)(The Swamp)

Direction
QAUAIL ALRUMMAN(LES SIESTES GRENADINES), TUNISIA, Assistant director (Trainee)
The Years of Mercy, SAUDI ARABIA, Director

References

1956 births
Living people
People from Riyadh